Revesby railway station is located on the East Hills line, serving the Sydney suburb of Revesby. It is served by Sydney Trains T8 Airport & South line services.

History

Revesby station opened on 21 December 1931 when the line was extended from Kingsgrove to East Hills. In 1956 a crossing loop was opened.

On 9 December 1985, the line from Revesby to East Hills was duplicated with a new track laid to the north of the existing one. The line from Kingsgrove to Revesby was duplicated around the same time.

The Rail Clearways Program saw the station's role change significantly, with plans to considerably boost capacity of the East Hills line by creating two centre turnbacks at the station to replace a side turnback at East Hills, and quadruplicating the line from Kingsgrove to Revesby.

In 2006, construction commenced on a second island platform and a replacement footbridge. Platform 3 opened in December 2008, as the main platform to the west. The existing Platform 2 became a centre turnback with only a few services initially using the facility. In October 2009, a new timetable was introduced, and Revesby replaced East Hills as the major intermediate terminus.

In April 2013, as part of the quadruplication of the line from Kingsgrove to Revesby, Platform 4 opened.

Platforms & services

Transport links
Transdev NSW operate four routes via Revesby station:
923: Bankstown Central to Panania
924: Bankstown Central to East Hills station
926: Bankstown Central to Padstow station
962: East Hills to Miranda
S5: Padstow station to Milperra

Revesby station is served by one NightRide route:
N40: East Hills station to Town Hall station

Trackplan

References

External links

Photo gallery showing construction of the new turnback platforms
Revesby station details Transport for New South Wales

City of Canterbury-Bankstown
Easy Access railway stations in Sydney
Railway stations in Sydney
Railway stations in Australia opened in 1931
East Hills railway line